Regina Elphinstone is a former provincial electoral division in the Canadian province of Saskatchewan.  It was the riding of former Premier Allan Blakeney and later of former Deputy Premier Dwain Lingenfelter.

Members of the Legislative Assembly

References

Former provincial electoral districts of Saskatchewan